In-flight entertainment (IFE) refers to the entertainment available to aircraft passengers during a flight. In 1936, the airship Hindenburg offered passengers a piano, lounge, dining room, smoking room, and bar during the -day flight between Europe and America. After World War II, IFE was delivered in the form of food and drink services, along with an occasional projector movie during lengthy flights. In 1985 the first personal audio player was offered to passengers, along with noise cancelling headphones in 1989. During the 1990s, the demand for better IFE was a major factor in the design of aircraft cabins. Before then, the most a passenger could expect was a movie projected on a screen at the front of a cabin, which could be heard via a headphone socket at their seat. Now, in most aircraft, private IFE TV screens are offered.

Design issues for IFE include system safety, cost efficiency, software reliability, hardware maintenance, and user compatibility.

The in-flight entertainment on board airlines is frequently managed by content service providers.

History

The first in-flight movie was in 1921 on Aeromarine Airways, showing a film called Howdy Chicago to its passengers as the amphibious airplane flew around Chicago. 
The film The Lost World was shown to passengers of an Imperial Airways flight in April 1925 between London (Croydon Airport) and Paris.

Eleven years later, in 1932, the first in-flight television called 'media event' was shown on a Western Air Express Fokker F.10 aircraft.

The post-WWII British Bristol Brabazon airliner was initially specified with a 37-seat cinema within its huge fuselage; this was later reduced to a 23-seat cinema sharing the rear of the aircraft with a lounge and cocktail bar. The aircraft never entered service.

However, it was not until the 1960s that in-flight entertainment (other than reading, sitting in a lounge and talking, or looking out the window) was becoming mainstream and popular. In 1961, David Flexer of Inflight Motion Pictures developed the 16mm film system using a 25-inch reel for a wide variety of commercial aircraft. Capable of holding the entire film, and mounted horizontally to maximize space, this replaced the previous 30-inch-diameter film reels. In 1961, TWA committed to Flexer's technology and was first to debut a feature film in flight. Interviewed by the New Yorker in 1962, Mr Flexner said, "an awful lot of ingenuity has gone into this thing, which started from my simply thinking one day, in flight, that air travel is both the most advanced form of transportation and the most boring.” Amerlon Productions, a subsidiary of Inflight, produced at least one film, Deadlier Than the Male, specifically for use on airplanes. Pakistan International Airlines was the first international airline to introduce this entertainment system showing a regularly scheduled film on board in the year 1962.

In 1963, Avid Airline Products developed and manufactured the first pneumatic headset used on board the airlines and provided these early headsets to TWA. These early systems consisted of in-seat audio that could be heard with hollow tube headphones. In 1979, pneumatic headsets were replaced by electronic headsets. The electronic headsets were initially available only on selected flights and premium cabins, whereas economy class still had to make do with the old pneumatic headsets. In the United States, the last airline to offer pneumatic headphones was Delta Air Lines, which switched to electronic headphones in 2003, despite the fact that all Delta aircraft since 1982, when the Boeing 767-200 was adopted, have included jacks for electronic headphones.

Throughout the early to mid-1960s, some in-flight movies were played back from videotape, using early compact transistorized videotape recorders made by Sony (such as the SV-201 and PV-201) and Ampex (such as the VR-660 and VR-1500), and played back on CRT monitors mounted on the upper sides in the cabin above the passenger seats with several monitors placed a few seats apart from each other. The audio was played back through the headsets.

In 1971, TRANSCOM developed the 8mm film cassette. Flight attendants could now change movies in-flight and add short subject programming.

In the late 1970s and early 1980s, CRT-based projectors began to appear on newer widebody aircraft, such as the Boeing 767. These used LaserDiscs or video cassettes for playback. Some airlines upgraded the old film IFE systems to the CRT-based systems in the late 1980s and early 1990s on some of their older widebodies. In 1985, Avicom introduced the first audio player system, based on the Philips Tape Cassette technology. In 1988, the Airvision company introduced the first in-seat audio/video on-demand systems using  LCD technology for Northwest Airlines. The trials, which were run by Northwest Airlines on its Boeing 747 fleet, received overwhelmingly positive passenger reaction. As a result, this completely replaced the CRT technology.

Today, in-flight entertainment is offered as an option on almost all wide body aircraft, while some narrow body aircraft are not equipped with any form of in-flight entertainment at all. This is mainly due to the aircraft storage and weight limits. The Boeing 757 was the first narrow body aircraft to widely feature both audio and video in-flight entertainment and today it is rare to find a Boeing 757 without an in-flight entertainment system. Most Boeing 757s feature ceiling-mounted CRT screens, although some newer 757s may feature drop-down LCDs or audio-video on demand systems in the back of each seat. Many Airbus A320 series and Boeing 737 Next Generation aircraft are also equipped with drop-down LCD screens. Some airlines, such as WestJet, United Airlines, and Delta Air Lines, have equipped some narrow body aircraft with personal video screens at every seat.  Others, such as Air Canada and JetBlue, have even equipped some regional jets with VOD.

For the introduction of personal TVs on board jetBlue, company management tracked that lavatory queuing went far down. They originally had two planes, one with functioning IFE and one with none; the functioning one later was called "the happy plane".

System safety and regulation
One major obstacle in creating an in-flight entertainment system is system safety.  With the sometimes miles of wiring involved, voltage leaks and arcing become a problem. This is more than a theoretical concern. The IFE system was implicated in the crash of Swissair Flight 111 in 1998. To contain any possible issues, the in-flight entertainment system is typically isolated from the main systems of the aircraft. In the United States, for an aviation product to be considered safe and reliable, it must be certified by the FAA and pass all of the applicable requirements found in the Federal Aviation Regulations. The concerning section, or title, dealing with the aviation industry and the electronic systems embedded in the aircraft, is CFR title 14 part 25. Contained inside Part 25 are rules relating to the aircraft's electronic system.

There are two major sections of the FAA's airworthiness regulations that regulate flight entertainment systems and their safety in transport category aircraft: 14 CFR 25.1301 which approves the electronic equipment for installation and use, by assuring that the system in question is properly labeled, and that its design is appropriate to its intended function. 14 CFR 25.1309 states that the electrical equipment must not alter the safety or functionality of the aircraft upon the result of a failure. One way for the intended IFE system to meet this regulatory requirement is for it to be independent from the aircraft's main power source and processor. By separating the power supplies and data links from that of the aircraft's performance processor, in the event of a failure the system is self-contained, and can not alter the functionality of the aircraft. Upon a showing of compliance to all of the applicable U.S. regulations the in-flight entertainment system is capable of being approved in the United States.  Certain U.S. design approvals for IFE may be directly accepted in other countries, or may be capable of being validated, under existing bilateral airworthiness safety agreements.

Cost efficiency
The companies involved are in a constant battle to cut costs of production, without cutting the system's quality and compatibility. Cutting production costs may be achieved by anything from altering the housing for personal televisions, to reducing the amount of embedded software in the in-flight entertainment processor. Difficulties with cost are also present with the customers, or airlines, looking to purchase in-flight entertainment systems. Most in-flight entertainment systems are purchased by existing airlines as an upgrade package to an existing fleet of aircraft. This cost can be anywhere from $2million to $5million for a plane to be equipped with a set of seat back LCD monitors and an embedded IFE system. Some of the IFE systems are being purchased already installed in a new aircraft, such as the Airbus A320, which eliminates the possibility of having upgrade difficulties. Some airlines are passing the cost directly into the customers ticket price, while some are charging a user fee based on an individual customers use. Some are also attempting to get a majority of the cost paid for by advertisements on, around, and in their IFE.

The largest international airlines sometimes pay more than $90,000 for a license to show one movie over a period of two or three months. These airlines usually feature up to 100 movies at once, whereas 20 years ago they would have only 10 or 12. In the United States, airlines pay a flat fee every time the movie is watched by a passenger. Some airlines spend up to $20million per year on content.

Software reliability
Software for in-flight entertainment systems should be aesthetically pleasing, reliable, compatible, and also must be user friendly. These restrictions account for expensive engineering of individually specific software. In-flight entertainment equipment is often touch screen sensitive, and can be controlled with a handset, allowing interaction between each seat in the aircraft and the flight attendants, which is wireless in some systems.  Along with a complete aircraft intranet to deal with, the software of the in-flight entertainment system must be reliable when communicating to and from the main in-flight entertainment processor. These additional requirements not only place an additional strain on the software engineers, but also on the price. Programming errors can slip through the testing phases of the software and cause problems.

Varieties of in-flight entertainment

Moving-map systems

A moving-map system is a real-time flight information video channel broadcast through to cabin project/video screens and personal televisions (PTVs). In addition to displaying a map that illustrates the position and direction of the plane, the system gives (utilizing both the imperial and metric systems) the altitude, airspeed, outside air temperature, distance to the destination, distance from the origination point, and origin/destination/local time (using both the 12-hour and 24-hour clocks). The moving-map system information is derived in real time from the aircraft's flight computer systems.

The first moving-map system designed for passengers was named Airshow and introduced in 1982. It was invented by Airshow Inc (ASINC), a small southern California corporation, which later became part of Rockwell Collins. KLM and Swissair were the first airlines to offer the moving map systems to their passengers.

The latest versions of moving-maps offered by IFE manufacturers include AdonisOne IFE, ICARUS Moving Map Systems, Airshow 4200 by Rockwell Collins, iXlor2 by Panasonic Avionics and JetMap HD by Honeywell Aerospace. In 2013, Betria Interactive unveiled FlightPath3D, a fully interactive moving-map that enables passengers to zoom and pan around a 3D world map using touch gestures, similar to Google Earth. FlightPath3D was chosen by Norwegian as the moving-map on their new fleet of Boeing 787 Dreamliners, running on Panasonic's Android based touch-screen IFE system.

After the attempted Christmas Day bombing of 2009, the United States Transportation Security Administration (TSA) briefly ordered the live-map shut-off on international flights landing in the United States. Some airlines complained that doing so may compel the entire IFE system to remain shut. After complaints from airlines and passengers alike, these restrictions were eased.

Audio entertainment
Audio entertainment covers music, as well as news, information, and comedy. Most music channels are pre-recorded and feature their own DJs to provide chatter, song introductions, and interviews with artists. In addition, there is sometimes a channel devoted to the plane's radio communications, allowing passengers to listen in on the pilot's in-flight conversations with other planes and ground stations.

In audio-video on demand (AVOD) systems, software such as MusicMatch is used to select music off the music server. Phillips Music Server is one of the most widely used servers running under Windows Media Center used to control AVOD systems.

This form of in-flight entertainment is experienced through headphones that are distributed to the passengers. The headphone plugs are usually only compatible with the audio socket on the passenger's armrest (and vice versa), and some airlines may charge a small fee to obtain a pair. The headphones provided can also be used for the viewing of personal televisions.

In-flight entertainment systems have been made compatible with XM Satellite Radio and with iPods, allowing passengers to access their accounts or bring their own music, along with offering libraries of full audio CDs from an assortment of artists.

Video entertainment

Video entertainment is provided via a large video screen at the front of a cabin section, as well as smaller monitors situated every few rows above the aisles. Sound is supplied via the same headphones as those distributed for audio entertainment.

However, personal televisions (PTVs) for every passenger provide passengers with channels broadcasting new and classic films, as well as comedies, news, sports programming, documentaries, children's shows, and drama series. Some airlines also present news and current affairs programming, which are often pre-recorded and delivered in the early morning before flights commence.

PTVs are operated via an in-flight Management System which stores pre-recorded channels on a central server and streams them to PTV equipped seats during flight. AVOD systems store individual programs separately, allowing a passenger to have a specific program streamed to them privately, and be able to control the playback.

Some airlines also provide video games as part of the video entertainment system. For example, Singapore Airlines passengers on some flights have access to a number of Super Nintendo games as part of its KrisWorld entertainment system. Also Virgin America's and Virgin Australia's Entertainment System offer passengers internet gaming over a Linux-based operating system.

Personal televisions

Most airlines have now installed personal televisions (otherwise known as PTVs) for every passenger on most long-haul routes. These televisions are usually located in the seat-backs or tucked away in the armrests for front row seats and first class.  Some show direct broadcast satellite television which enables passengers to view live TV broadcasts. Some airlines also offer video games using PTV equipment. Many are now providing closed captioning for deaf and hard-of-hearing passengers.

Audio-video on demand (AVOD) entertainment has also been introduced. This enables passengers to pause, rewind, fast-forward, or stop a program that they have been watching. This is in contrast to older entertainment systems where no interactivity is provided for. AVOD also allows the passengers to choose among movies stored in the aircraft computer system.

In addition to the personal televisions that are installed in the seatbacks, a new portable media player (PMP) revolution is under way.  There are two types available: commercial off the shelf (COTS) based players and proprietary players. PMPs can be handed out and collected by the cabin crew, or can be "semi-embedded" into the seatback or seat arm. In both of these scenarios, the PMP can pop in and out of an enclosure built into the seat, or an arm enclosure. An advantage of PMPs is that, unlike seatback PTVs, equipment boxes for the inflight entertainment system do not need to be installed under the seats, since those boxes increase the weight of the aircraft and impede legroom.

In-flight movies
Personal on-demand videos are stored in an aircraft's main in-flight entertainment system, whence they can be viewed on demand by a passenger over the aircraft's built in media server and wireless broadcast system. Along with the on-demand concept comes the ability for the user to pause, rewind, fast forward, or jump to any point in the movie. There are also movies that are shown throughout the aircraft at one time, often on shared overhead screens or a screen in the front of the cabin. More modern aircraft are now allowing Personal Electronic Devices (PEDs) to be used to connect to the on board in-flight entertainment systems.

Regularly scheduled in flight movies began to premiere in 1961 on flights from New York to Los Angeles. The first movie shown was  By Love Possessed (1961), starring Lana Turner; it was first shown on July 19, 1961, when TWA showed it to its first-class passengers.

Closed-captioning
Closed captioning technology for deaf and hard-of-hearing passengers started in 2008 with Emirates Airlines. The captions are text streamed along with video and spoken audio and enables passengers to either enable or disable the subtitle/caption language. Closed captioning is capable of streaming various text languages, including Arabic, Chinese, English, French, German, Hindi, Spanish, and Russian. The technology is currently based on Scenarist file multiplexing so far; however, portable media players tend to use alternative technologies. A WAEA technical committee is trying to standardize the closed caption specification. In 2009, the US Department of Transportation ruled a compulsory use of captions of all videos, DVDs, and other audio-visual displays played for safety and/or informational purposes in aircraft should be high-contrast captioned (e.g., white letters on a consistent black background [14 CFR Part 382/ RIN 2105–AD41 /OST Docket No. 2006–23999]). As of 2013, several airlines, including 
United Airlines, 
Qantas 
Southwest
 and Emirates, 
have closed-captioning provided on their AVOD systems.

In-flight games
Video games are another emerging facet of in-flight entertainment. Some game systems are networked to allow interactive playing by multiple passengers. Later generations of IFE games began to shift focus from pure entertainment to learning. The best examples of this changing trend are the popular trivia game series and the Berlitz Word Traveler that allows passengers to learn a new language in their own language. Appearing as a mixture of lessons and mini games, passengers can learn the basics of a new language while being entertained. Many more learning applications continue to appear in the IFE market.

Islamic prayers and directions to Mecca
In several airlines from the Muslim world, the AVOD systems provide Qibla directions to allow Muslims to pray toward Mecca (e.g. Emirates, Turkish Airlines, Pakistan International Airlines, Etihad Airways, Malaysia Airlines, IranAir, Qatar Airways, Mahan Air, Royal Jordanian and Saudia); Saudia and Malaysia Airlines have built-in Qur'an e-books and Garuda Indonesia has a unique Qur'an channel. Saudia and Emirates also have built-in complete audio Qur'ans.

In-flight connectivity

In recent years, IFE has been expanded to include in-flight connectivity—services such as Internet browsing, text messaging, cell phone usage (where permitted), and emailing. In fact, some in the airline industry have begun referring to the entire in-flight-entertainment category as "IFEC" (In-Flight Entertainment and Connectivity or In-Flight Entertainment and Communication).

The aircraft manufacturer Boeing entered into the in-flight-connectivity industry in 2000 and 2001 with an offshoot called Connexion by Boeing. The service was designed to provide in-flight broadband service to commercial airlines; Boeing built partnerships with United Airlines, Delta, and American. By 2006, however, the company announced it was closing down its Connexion operation. Industry analysts cited technology, weight, and cost issues as making the service unfeasible at the time.

Since the shuttering of Connexion by Boeing, several new providers have emerged to deliver in-flight broadband to airlines—notably Row 44, OnAir and AeroMobile (who offer satellite-based solutions), and Aircell (which offers air-to-ground connectivity via a cellular signal).

In the past few years, many US commercial airlines have begun testing and deploying in-flight connectivity for their passengers, such as Alaska Airlines, American, Delta, and United. Industry expectations were that by the end of 2011, thousands of planes flying in the US will offer some form of in-flight broadband to passengers. Airlines around the world are also beginning to test in-flight-broadband offerings as well.

Satellite and internal telephony
Now, airlines provide satellite telephones integrated into their system. These are either found at strategic locations in the aircraft or integrated into the passenger remote control used for the individual in-flight entertainment.  Passengers can use their credit card to make phone calls anywhere on the ground. A rate close to US$10.00/minute is usually charged regardless of where the recipient is located and a connection fee may be applied even if the recipient does not answer. These systems are usually not capable of receiving incoming calls. There are also some aircraft that allow faxes to be sent and the rate is usually the same as the call rate, but at a per page rate. Some systems also allow the transmission of SMS.

More modern systems allow passengers to call fellow passengers located in another seat by simply keying in the recipient's seat number.

Data communication
IFE producers have begun to introduce Intranet type systems. Virgin America's, Virgin Atlantic's and Virgin Australia's Entertainment Systems allow for passengers to chat amongst one another, compete against each other in the provided games, talk to the flight attendants and request, and pay for in advance, food or drinks, and have full access to the internet and email. Other full service airlines such as China Airlines have launched IFEs with similar functionalities on board their Boeing 777 and Airbus A350 aircraft.

Wi-Fi
Several airlines are testing in-cabin wi-fi systems. In-flight internet service is provided either through a satellite network or an air-to-ground network. In the Airbus A380 aircraft, data communication via satellite system allows passengers to connect to live Internet from the individual IFE units or their laptops via the in-flight Wi-Fi access.

Boeing's cancellation of the Connexion by Boeing system in 2006 caused concerns that inflight internet would not be available on next-generation aircraft such as Qantas's fleet of Airbus A380s and Boeing Dreamliner 787s. However, Qantas announced in July 2007 that all service classes in its fleet of A380s would have wireless internet access as well as seat-back access to email and cached web browsing when the Airbuses started operations in October 2008. Certain elements were also retrofitted into existing Boeing 747-400s.

Sixteen major U.S. airlines now offer Wi-Fi connectivity service on their aircraft.  The majority of these airlines use the service provided by Gogo Wi-Fi service. The service allows for Wi-Fi enabled devices to connect to the Internet. Delta currently has the most Wi-Fi equipped fleet with 500 aircraft that now offer in-flight Wi-Fi.

In 2019, some airlines removed seatback screens, saving money by streaming video to passenger personal mobile devices.

Mobile phone

As a general rule, mobile phone use while airborne is usually not just prohibited by the carrier, but also by regulatory agencies in the relevant jurisdiction (e.g. FAA and FCC in the US).  However, with added technology, some carriers nonetheless allow the use of mobile phones on selected routes.

Emirates became the first airline to allow mobile phones to be used during flight. Using the systems supplied by telecom company AeroMobile, Emirates launched the service commercially on 20 March 2008. 
Installed first on an Airbus A340-300, AeroMobile is presently operating across the entire Emirates fleet of Boeing 777s and Airbus A380s.

Ryanair had previously aimed to become the first airline to enable mobile phone usage in the air, but instead ended up launching its system commercially in February 2009. The system is set up on 22 737-800 jets based at Dublin Airport and was fitted on Ryanair's 200+ fleet off 737-800 jets by 2010.

OnAir offers inflight mobile connectivity to a range of airlines through its GSM network. The GSM network connects to the ground infrastructure via an Inmarsat SwiftBroadband satellite which provides consistent global coverage.

Virgin Australia also has an onboard Wi-Fi service, free on all domestic flights but paid based on time usage aboard international flights (as of 2020 this is no longer available), however since their takeover by Bain capital Virgin Australia has reverted to In-flight streaming without live internet access. It is said to be "reviewed" as a part of their overall goal to pull Virgin Australia from bankruptcy.

China Airlines and Singapore Airlines also have similar Wi-Fi services, paid in a similar way to Virgin Australia's service.

Backbone connectivity 
While SpaceX and OneWeb are testing low Earth orbit satellites, with Amazon seeking approval for more, and companies like  are working on HAPS prototypes, aircraft-based connectivity upstarts like Simi Valley, AWN or Aeronet Global Communications Services are dwindling down.

References

External links

Airline Passenger Experience Association (was previously WAEA)
Code of Federal Regulations Title 14(Aeronautics and Space)

In-flight passenger facilities
Travel technology
Aircraft cabin components
Aviation mass media